Antoni Martí Petit (born 30 July 1963) is an Andorran architect and politician who served as the prime minister of Andorra from May 2011 to 16 May 2019, when he was elected on the ticket of the Democrats for Andorra. He was re-elected in the 2015 parliamentary election.

Early life and education

Martí was born in Escaldes-Engordany and studied at the École nationale supérieure d'architecture de Toulouse (Toulouse National School of Architecture), part of the Université fédérale de Toulouse Midi-Pyrénées. He is an architect by profession.

Political career

Martí was first elected to the General Council in 1993, the first parliamentary election to involve political parties, as a member of the Liberal Union. In the election, the Liberal Union came a close second. Òscar Ribas Reig, who had been appointed Prime Minister, lost a vote of no confidence in 1994, leading to Marc Forné Molné, the leader of the Liberal Union, being appointed as Prime Minister. Martí was re-elected in the 1997 election, in which the Liberal Union won and Molné remained as Prime Minister. Shortly before the 2001 election, the Liberal Union was renamed as the Liberal Party of Andorra, and went on to win the election, with Molné retaining his role as Prime Minister.

In 2004, Martí resigned from the General Council and was elected as Mayor of Escaldes-Engordany, the second largest town in Andorra. He served two consecutive terms as Mayor, from 2004 to 2007, and from 2008 to 2011. The Liberal Party had contested the 2009 election as part of the Reformist Coalition, losing to the Social Democratic Party led by Jaume Bartumeu. Bartumeu opted to call an early election in 2011 after losing the budget vote two years running to the opposition parties. In February 2011, the Democrats for Andorra was formed as a direct successor to the Reformist Coalition, with Martí as their candidate for Prime Minister. He campaigned against Bartumeu's proposed introduction of an income tax. The Democrats for Andorra won 55.5% of the vote, and Bartumeu resigned as Prime Minister on 28 April 2011, to be replaced by Pere López Agràs in an interim capacity until 12 May 2011, when Martí was appointed.

In 2011, Martí opened negotiations with the European Union over various aspects of cooperation. During the negotiations, Andorra changed the foreign investment law, opening the country up to foreign investors, and also signed an agreement with France and Spain to avoid double taxation. Martí has also overseen the introduction of the euro as the official currency of Andorra, following an agreement which was completed in June 2011. Andorra was permitted to issue their own euros from July 2013, but due to various delays, Andorran euros did not enter circulation until January 2015. In late May 2013, Martí met with François Hollande, the President of France and a Co-Prince of Andorra, to inform him of his intentions to bring in a law to introduce personal income tax in Andorra. Hollande encouraged Martí to continue with economic reforms that may lead to growth. In June 2013, Martí bowed to pressure from the European Union and did introduce a personal income tax for Andorrans.

As Prime Minister, Martí oversaw the response to the 2015 Andorran banking crisis, involving American allegations of money laundering made against the Banca Privada d'Andorra (BPA). The government responded to this by the restructuring of the bank, and the creation and sale of Vall Banc in place of BPA. In June 2016, Martí praised Michel Camdessus's 2005 report about Andorra, that "turned out to be prophetic." In turn, Camdessus expressed his respect for "the government of Andorra for the fact that the Principality embarked on the path of reforms, turning from protectionism and stagnation in the direction of openness and competitiveness."

References

External links 

 govern.ad Andorra Government website

1963 births
Democrats for Andorra politicians
Heads of Government of Andorra
Living people
Members of the General Council (Andorra)
Andorran architects
People from Escaldes-Engordany